The W.A.R. Zero is a half-scale homebuilt replica of a Mitsubishi A6M2 fighter.

Specifications (W.A.R. Zero)

Notes

References

Kitplanes. Aug 2001
Recreational Flyer. Nov 1988.
Recreational Flyer. Fall 1987.
Popular Mechanics. Jan 1981.
Popular Flying. Nov 1981.
Homebuilt Aircraft. Nov 1980.
Popular Mechanics. Jan 1980.

External links
 War Aircraft Replicas International Inc 
 W.A.R. Aircraft Replicas International

Homebuilt aircraft
Zero
Single-engined tractor aircraft
Low-wing aircraft
1980s United States sport aircraft
Replica aircraft